Benjamini may refer to:

 Itai Benjamini, Israeli mathematician
 Yoav Benjamini (born 1949), Israeli statistician

See also